Pedro Agerre, best known as Axular, was one of the main Basque writers of the 17th century. His main work was Gero (Later), published in 1643, an ascetic book written with elaborate prose and composed following the traumatic period of the Basque witch trials (1609-1613).

Despite hailing from the house Axular, located in Urdazubi/Urdax (Navarre), he was appointed to the neighbouring parish of Sara (Labourd), where he stood out in his preaching. On the maternal line, he was related to Martin Azpilkueta and Francis Xavier.

External links
Online edition of Gero

Basque writers
Basque-language writers
1556 births
1644 deaths
Spanish writers